Wolves is the fifth studio album by American rock band Story of the Year.  The album was released on December 8, 2017. In October 2017, the band released "Bang Bang", their first single in more than seven years.

Background
After touring constantly for close to a decade, the band took a hiatus and started families. During that time, bass guitarist Adam Russell and the ensemble parted ways with Philip Sneed taking over on bass. However, in 2018, Sneed announced his departure, along with the return of Russell to the band. The group funded their album via PledgeMusic.

Composition
Lead vocalist Dan Marsala states that "Bang Bang" "encompasses the message of the album at large – the idea of the wolves closing in and time running out". The singer goes on to say that "Wolves is a metaphor for time slipping away; how it’s like a pack of wolves closing in."

Track listing

Personnel
Story of the Year
Dan Marsala – lead vocals
Ryan Phillips – guitars
Philip Sneed – bass guitar, vocals
Josh Wills – drums, percussion

References

2017 albums
Story of the Year albums